Dunckel is a surname. Notable people with the surname include:

Dorothea Dunckel (1799–1878), Swedish poet, translator, and playwright
Jean-Benoît Dunckel (born 1969), French musician
Miller Dunckel (1899–1975), Michigan politician

See also
Dunkle